Marc Morley (born November 1, 1979) is from Canton, New York is a lacrosse player for the Philadelphia Barrage in the Major League Lacrosse, and formerly of the Philadelphia Wings, New Jersey Storm, and Anaheim Storm in the National Lacrosse League.

Morley attended the University of Massachusetts Amherst where he was honored as an All-American Player in 2002.    
 
Morley has been named to Team USA in the 2007 World Indoor Lacrosse Championships.

References

1979 births
Living people
Philadelphia Wings players
Major League Lacrosse players
American lacrosse players
UMass Minutemen lacrosse players